Boethius is a small lunar impact crater located on the east edge of Mare Undarum near the eastern lunar limb. To the southwest is the dark, lava-flooded crater  Dubyago.

Boethius is circular and cup-shaped, with inner walls sloping down to the tiny central floor. It has a higher albedo than the surrounding terrain, and is not overlain by other impact craters of note. It was named after the Roman philosopher Boethius. Before 1976, it was identified as Dubyago U.

References

External links

 LTO-63D1 Boethius — L&PI topographic map

Impact craters on the Moon